Robert Marie Joseph Émile Henri Eugène d'Heilly (17 June 1876 – 31 October 1953) was a French rower. He competed in the men's single sculls event at the 1900 Summer Olympics.

References

External links

1876 births
1953 deaths
French male rowers
Olympic rowers of France
Rowers at the 1900 Summer Olympics
Rowers from Paris
European Rowing Championships medalists
20th-century French people